The  Farmersville Masonic Lodge No. 214, A.F. and A.M.  is a historic Italianate building located in Farmersville, Texas. It was constructed in 1888 as a meeting hall for Farmersville Lodge No. 214 (a local Masonic lodge).

The building was listed on the National Register of Historic Places (under the name:  "Farmersville Masonic Lodge No. 214, A.F. and A.M.") in 2005.

Later, the building houses the Farmersville Times, a local area newspaper and Farmersville lodge meets elsewhere.

See also

National Register of Historic Places listings in Collin County, Texas
Recorded Texas Historic Landmarks in Collin County

References

Buildings and structures in Collin County, Texas
Former Masonic buildings in Texas
Masonic buildings completed in 1888
Clubhouses on the National Register of Historic Places in Texas
National Register of Historic Places in Collin County, Texas
Recorded Texas Historic Landmarks